ProlecGE is a Mexican transformer manufacturer located in the city of Apodaca, Nuevo León, Mexico. The joint venture between Grupo Xignux and General Electric (49.99%) is one of the largest transformer manufacturers in the Americas, with a 14% share of the transformer market in the United States in 2014.  The company produces a line of transformer products for the generation, transmission, and distribution of electric power. In addition to operations in Mexico, the company owns two factories in India and one in Brazil.

References

External links 
 
 Official Xignux page

Manufacturing companies of Mexico
Electric transformer manufacturers